Kizgi (Qıźğı) is a rural locality (a village) in Bakaldinsky Selsoviet, Arkhangelsky District, Bashkortostan, Russia. The population was 168 as of 2010. There are 3 streets.

Geography 
Kizgi is located 28 km east of Arkhangelskoye (the district's administrative centre) by road. Petropavlovka is the nearest rural locality.

References 

Rural localities in Arkhangelsky District